Carl Roy Forberg (March 4, 1911 – January 17, 2000) was an American racecar driver from Omaha, Nebraska.

Indy 500 results

World Championship career summary
The Indianapolis 500 was part of the FIA World Championship from 1950 through 1960. Drivers competing at Indy during those years were credited with World Championship points and participation. Carl Forberg participated in 1 World Championship race, finishing seventh.

1911 births
2000 deaths
Indianapolis 500 drivers
Sportspeople from Omaha, Nebraska
Racing drivers from Nebraska